Sokołów Podlaski  is a town in Poland, in Masovian Voivodeship, about  east of Warsaw. The town lies on the Cetynia river, in the historical region of Podlachia and is the capital of Sokołów County. The first settlement was in the 6th century and the town received its charter in 1424. Population in 2004 was 18,434 (18,481 in 2010 and 18,720 in 2013).

History

Middle Ages and early modern era

The beginnings of settlement in this area date back to 6th century AD. The Sokołów area belongs to that part of Podlachia, which, due to its location, was a typical settler outpost. This area in early Medieval time was a scene of the feudal fights between the Polish and Ruthenian states, the Teutonic Knights, Yotvingians and Lithuanians. Political history of this land strongly influenced its cultural development and progress of colonisation. 

Archaeological research to determinate the cultural and ethnic structure of the settlements discovered numerous archaeological sites from the early Middle Ages in the area, which allowed scientists to accurately reproduce the phases of colonisation process and the character of defensive and residential building structures of the settlements. The archaeologists found evidence of settlements in the area dating from 6th and 7th centuries. Ceramics, iron fittings, buckles, beads, staples and numerous items of burial equipment testify about the culture, customs and rituals celebrated to honour the dead. The study confirmed that in a place of old Russian and Polish settlements in the Cetynia river valley, as a result of gradual colonisation, new settlement at Sokołów was established.

Sokołów Podlaski received city rights in 1424 from the Grand Duke of Lithuania Witold.
In 1508 Stanisław Kiszka became the new owner of the town. Administratively Sokołów was part of the Podlaskie Voivodeship of the Lesser Poland Province of the Polish Crown. In 1580 King Stephen Báthory visited Sokołów. Sokołów belonged to Kiszka until 1592, when it was passed to the Radziwiłł family. For Sokołów it was a time of the greatest prosperity in its history, uninterrupted until the Swedish invasion in the middle of the 17th century. During the war with Sweden the city was significantly damaged. In 1657 Rakoczy's army burned down the town together with surrounding farms. During the Reformation, the city was one of the strongest centers of Arianism in Podlachia.

In 1668 Jan Krasiński became the new owner of the town. After the second half of the 18th century the town belonged to the Ogiński family. Under their rule craftsmanship quickly developed in Sokołów. Michał Kleofas Ogiński brought French craftsmen who started the production of silk scarves, hats, rugs, linen and Slutsk sashes.

Late modern era

After the Third Partition of Poland Sokołów fell under Austrian rule, and after the Polish-Austrian war, in 1809, became part of the Polish Duchy of Warsaw. In 1815 it became part of Congress Poland, later on forcibly annexed by Russia. In 1833 the town was purchased from Michał Kleofas Ogiński by local landowner Karol Kobyloński, who 10 years later sold it to Elżbieta Hirschman. The new owner in 1845 established the sugar factory "Elżbietów" in Przeździatka (today on the western outskirts of Sokołów Podlaski) and in 1890, the factory employed 600 workers. The sugar factory played an important role for the development of the city and local agriculture.

During the January Insurrection local priest Stanisław Brzóska became a famous leader of the Polish resistance against Russian rule. He was arrested, sentenced by the tsarist authorities to death by hanging, and executed in the town centre on 23 May 1865. In 1925 a granite monument was erected as a memorial at the site of Brzóska's execution.

In 1867 Sokołów became the property of the state and the district office was established there. In 1887, after the construction of the railway line, the city became an important communication link. Between 1845–1890 the population of the town doubled, mostly thanks to immigrants, the majority of which were Jews, who, being artisans, craftsmen and merchants, made a great contribution to the further development of the town. During this period new factories were opened in addition to the sugar factory. In 1915, during World War I, the Germans entered the city, ending the period of Russian rule, and the three-year period of German occupation began. Sokołów became part of Poland again in 1918, after the country declared independence.

World War II

During World War II Sokołów suffered heavy losses. As a result of the war 30% of residential and 70% of official buildings were destroyed and the population was drastically reduced. With the beginning of German occupation, many Jews fled. For those who left in August 1941 German authorities created a ghetto, which existed until the end of September 1942. A significant number of the Jewish population were killed in the ghetto and others transported to the Treblinka extermination camp. The liberation of the city took place on 8 August 1944.

Post-war Poland

Between 1951 and 1974 the electromechanical, chemical and furniture industries developed significantly. In 1975 a meat processing company was established, which over time, as Sokołów, became one of the largest companies in the Polish meat industry.

Notable residents
Zofia Kielan-Jaworowska (1925–2015), paleobiologist

References

External links
 
 
 Sokolow Podlaski, from the Encyclopedia of Jewish Communities in Poland
 Jewish Community in Sokołów Podlaski on Virtual Shtetl

Cities and towns in Masovian Voivodeship
Sokołów County
Lublin Governorate
Warsaw Voivodeship (1919–1939)
Holocaust locations in Poland